Charles William Harbidge (15  July 1891 – 1 October 1980) was an English footballer who represented Great Britain at the 1920 Summer Olympics.

References

1891 births
1980 deaths
English footballers
Reading F.C. players
Olympic footballers of Great Britain
Footballers at the 1920 Summer Olympics
Association football wing halves